Bloodbath is the fourth studio album by Greek thrash metal band Suicidal Angels, released on 27 January 2012. It is their second album for NoiseArt Records, and their first to enter the German and Austrian official album charts.

The production took place at the Music Factory and Prophecy Studios in Germany, as well as Zero Gravity Studios in Athens. The band works with Jörg Uken for the mix and master at Soundlodge Studios, based in Rhauderfehn, Germany.

Track listing
All music and arrangements by Suicidal Angels; All lyrics by Melissourgos.

Personnel

References 

2012 albums